is a city in Hyōgo Prefecture, Japan. , the city had an estimated population of 75,009 and a population density of 420 persons per km².

Geography
Miki is located in the southwestern part of Hyogo prefecture, northwest of Kobe, on the 135th meridian east line. It is included in the Harima Plain on the west side of the Rokko Mountains and on the south side of the Chugoku Mountains, and the Mino River flows from east to west in the city area. Fluvial terraces and gentle hills spread around the plains. Since it is inland, precipitation is relatively low and there are many ponds. There is an old town along the Mino River, and a new residential area near the border with Kobe City in the southeastern part. The highest point in the city is 453 meters above sea level on Mt. Shibire.

Neighboring municipalities
Hyōgo Prefecture
Kobe
Sanda
Kakogawa
Ono
Katō
Inami

Climate
Miki has a humid subtropical climate (Köppen climate classification Cfa) with hot summers and cool to cold winters. Precipitation is significantly higher in summer than in winter, though on the whole lower than most parts of Honshū, and there is no significant snowfall.

Demographics
Per Japanese census data, the population of Miki in 2020 is 75,294 people. Miki has been conducting censuses since 1920.

History
The area of the modern city of Mino was within ancient Harima Province, and developed as a castle town at the foot of Miki Castle during the Muromachi period. During the Sengoku period, the castle was destroyed in the Siege of Miki.  In the Edo Period, the area was controlled by Himeji Domain. The town of Miki was established within Mino District, Hyōgo with the creation of the modern municipalities system on April 1, 1889.  It was raised to city status on June 1, 1954. On October 24, 2005, the town of Yokawa (from Mino District) was merged into Miki.

Government
Miki has a mayor-council form of government with a directly elected mayor and a unicameral city council of 16 members. Miki contributes one member to the Hyogo Prefectural Assembly. In terms of national politics, the city is part of Hyōgo 4th district of the lower house of the Diet of Japan.

Economy
Miki has had an industrial economy based on metalworking from the early Edo Period, and continues to promote itself nationwide as the main production area for hand tools and hardware. Agriculture, notably the growing of "Yamada Nishiki" brand rice and vineyards for the production of grapes is also important. The central and northern parts of the city have numerous golf courses and forest areas for recreation. The city is increasingly becoming a commuter town for Kobe and Osaka due to its proximity.

Education
Miki has 13 public elementary schools, six public middle schools and one combined elementary/middle school operated by the city government and four public high school operated by the Hyōgo Prefectural Department of Education. The prefecture also operates one special education school for the handicapped. A private college, the Kansai University of International Studies,  is located in Izumi.

Transportation

Railway
 Kobe Electric Railway (Shintetsu) – Ao Line
  -  -  -   -  -  -

Highway
  San'yō Expressway
  Chūgoku Expressway
  Maizuru-Wakasa Expressway

Local attractions
Miki Castle ruins, National Historic Site
Ōmiya Hachiman Shrine
Gaya-in, Buddhist temple with numerous National Treasures and Important Cultural Properties

Sister city relations
  Visalia, California, USA
  Federation Council, New South Wales, Australia

Notable people from Miki, Hyōgo
 Tsutomu Oosugi, Japanese professional wrestler
 Yuki Kadono, Japanese snowboarder (Slopestyle)
 Ōtsukasa Nobuhide, former sumo wrestler
 Takashi Shimizu, Japanese professional baseball player (Catcher)

References

External links

  

 
Cities in Hyōgo Prefecture